Harrisia brasiliensis is a species of tachinid flies in the genus Harrisia of the family Tachinidae.

External links

Tachinidae
Insects of Brazil